Samuel Slater may refer to:

Samuel or Sam Slater may also refer to:

Samuel S. Slater, politician

See also